Merthen Manor (meaning sea fort) is a 16th-century manor house in west Cornwall, England, UK. For most of its history it has been in the ownership of the prominent Cornish family, the Vyvyan family.

History
The land of Merthen was originally part of the manor of Winnianton, which was given to Richard, 1st Earl of Cornwall by his brother, Henry III, in 1225, who then swapped it with Gervase de Tintagel for Tintagel Castle. Ralph Reskymer obtained Merthen in the early part of the 15th century, and it became family seat of the Reskymers.

The current manor house is thought to have been built in 1575 by John Reskymer and his wife Grace, due to their coat of arms over the entrance, although it may originate earlier and the coat of arms are an indication a remodelling or reduction. Grace died in 1627, 10 years after her husband, and in 1629 it was sold to Sir Francis Vyvyan of Trelowarren and has remained with the family since.

In the early 19th century the house was remodelled again, and the interior was renovated in the 20th century.

Estate
In the early part of Merthen's history it was the prominent place of the parish and had a deer park.

Merthen Wood

The woods to the south of the manor house, on the banks of the Helford River, were designated a Site of Special Scientific Interest in 1972 for their biological characteristics. The  site is of importance due to its population of Sessile Oak (Quercus petraea). Other notable species within the woods include the nationally uncommon Bastard Balm (Melittis melissophyllum) and the nationally rare mosses Fissidens curnowii and Hookeria lucens.

The woods are home to the largest British population of Anchonidium unguiculare rare weevil, which only exist in woodland along the Helford River within Britain.

Merthen Manor today
Merthen Manor, now owned by Mary Vyvyan, is a Grade II* listed building and provides bed & breakfast accommodation in the main house and self-catering accommodation in the converted barn.

References

External links
 Merthen Manor website

Country houses in Cornwall
Manors in Cornwall
Grade II* listed buildings in Cornwall
Grade II* listed houses
Houses completed in 1575
Sites of Special Scientific Interest in Cornwall
Nature Conservation Review sites
National Heritage List for England
Buildings and structures in Cornwall